The 2015–16 Segunda División Femenina de Fútbol will be the 2015–16 edition of Spain's women's football second league.

Competition format
The champion of each group and the best runner-up will qualify to the promotion play-offs. For the group 6, composed by teams from the Canary Islands, the two best teams of each sub-group will join a previous playoff where the champion will be the eighth team qualified.

Only two teams will promote to Primera División.

Group 1

Group 2

Group 3

Group 4

Group 5

Group 6

group 6.1

group 6.2

Bracket

Group 7

Best runner-up
The best runner-up of the entire group phase qualified automatically for the promotion play-off

Playoffs bracket

Real Betis and UD Tacuense achieved promotion to the 2016–17 Primera División. Both teams will make their debut in the top league.

References

Spa
2
Women2
Segunda División (women) seasons